The 1963 Pro Bowl was the National Football League's thirteenth annual all-star game which featured the outstanding performers from the  season. The game was played on January 13, 1963, at the Los Angeles Memorial Coliseum in Los Angeles, California, under sunny skies in front of 61,374 fans.

The Eastern Conference was coached by Allie Sherman of the New York Giants and the West by Vince Lombardi of the Green Bay Packers. Both were the coaches in the NFL Championship Game, held two weeks earlier in New York.

Fullback Jim Brown of the Cleveland Browns set a Pro Bowl record, carrying for 141 yards, breaking his own record of 120 set the previous year; he was named the "Back of the Game." "Big Daddy" Gene Lipscomb of the Pittsburgh Steelers was awarded "Lineman of the Game" honors; he had perhaps the finest day of any defender in the history of the Pro Bowl, blocking two field goals and being responsible for hits that led to six West fumbles. It was Lipscomb's final NFL appearance; he died four months later.

References

External links

Pro Bowl
Pro Bowl
Pro Bowl
Pro Bowl
1963 in Los Angeles
National Football League in Los Angeles
January 1963 sports events in the United States